Utrecht Zuilen is a railway station located in Utrecht, Netherlands. The station opened on 10 June 2007 and is located on the Amsterdam–Arnhem railway. The services are currently operated by Nederlandse Spoorwegen.

Train services
The following services currently call at Utrecht Zuilen:
2x per hour local service (sprinter) Amsterdam - Utrecht - Rhenen
2x per hour local service (sprinter) Breukelen - Utrecht - Veenendaal Centrum

Bus services

 10 - Lunetten - Transwijk - Oog in Al - Zuilen - Overvecht - Wittevrouwen - Rijnsweerd - De Uithof WKZ

References
NS website
GVU website
Dutch public transport planner

Zuilen
Railway stations opened in 2007